The 2nd Council of the Northwest Territories, known formally as the Council of the Northwest Territories, was the governing body of Canada's Northwest Territories from 1905 to 1951. In 1905 when Alberta and Saskatchewan were carved out the Northwest Territories, there were too few enfranchised voters in the remaining area of the Territories to justify responsible government. The Northwest Territories reverted to 1870 constitutional status. Political parties and the position of Lieutenant Governor was abolished. The government came under the direct control of Ottawa.

Council history
In 1905 Frederick D. White was appointed the first commissioner of the Northwest Territories by Sir Wilfrid Laurier to oversee a four-man appointed council. No council was appointed until 1921, but provisions existed in law for four council seats. The Northwest Territories was instead run by the Department of Mines and Resources Canada and no legislation under territorial jurisdiction was passed or updated in this period.

In 1921 a deputy commissioner position was created and the first session of the council was convened in Ottawa. The first act of the council was to increase the number of members to six. The deputy commissioner position and a seat on the council were automatically given to the Director of Mines and Resources. All legislation during this council was created with the advice and guidance of the director. In essence the director was a de facto government leader, and held more power than the commissioner.

In 1939 a special administration district was created. This was a hybrid between an electoral district and a Senate division. It was not until 1947 when John G. McNiven would be appointed to represent the district. He would also be the first person living in the Northwest Territories since 1905 and the first person from the Arctic to sit on the council.

All other members of the council were from outside of the territories, and usually civil servants residing in Ottawa. This period of Northwest Territories history is generally regarded by the people of the Northwest Territories as a time of great neglect. The council during this period never had any sessions in the Territories, but members did travel occasionally to consult with municipal governments.

Commissioners during the 2nd Council

Note:
1Hugh Young continued to serve as commissioner after the sixth general election.

Deputy commissioners during the 2nd Council

Note:
1Frank Cunningham continued to serve as deputy commissioner after the sixth general election.

Deputy Commissioners also counted as regular members of the Northwest Territories council.

Members of the 2nd Council

Note:
Members during this period were appointed until the dissolution of the council in 1951, and vacancy only occurred on resignation or death.

References

External links

Northwest Territories Legislative Assemblies
Northwest Territories